Michael Brady may refer to:

 Michael Brady (baseball) (born 1987), American baseball player
 Michael Brady (philosopher) (born 1965), British philosopher
 Michael Brady (politician) (born 1962), American state legislator
 Michael Brady (soccer) (born 1964), English-born American soccer player and coach
 Mike Brady (golfer) (1887–1972), American golfer
 Mike Brady (musician) (born 1947), Australian musician
 Mike Brady, founder of Chicago Express Airlines
 Mickey Brady (born 1950), Sinn Féin politician in Northern Ireland
 Sir J. Michael Brady (born 1945), Australian-British computer scientist
 Mike Brady (The Brady Bunch), a character on the TV program The Brady Bunch